Visual artifacts (also artefacts) are anomalies apparent during visual representation as in digital graphics and other forms of imagery, especially photography and microscopy.

In digital graphics

 Image quality factors, different types of visual artifacts
 Compression artifacts
 Digital artifacts, visual artifacts resulting from digital image processing
 Noise
 Screen-door effect, also known as fixed-pattern noise (FPN), a visual artifact of digital projection technology
Ghosting (television)
Screen burn-in
 Distortion
 Silk screen effect
 Rainbow effect
 Screen tearing
 Moiré pattern
 Color banding

In video entertainment
Many people who use their computers as a hobby experience artifacting due to a hardware or software malfunction. The cases can differ but the usual causes are:

 Temperature issues, such as failure of cooling fan.
 Unsuited video card (graphics card) drivers.
 Drivers that have values that the graphics card is not suited with.
 Overclocking beyond the capabilities of the particular video card.
 Software bugs in the application or operating system.

The differing cases of visual artifacting can also differ between scheduled task(s).

In photography

These effects can occur in both analog and digital photography.
 Chromatic aberration due to optical dispersion through a lens, leading to color fringes at high-contrast boundaries in a photograph
 Purple fringing
 Motion blur
 Near-camera reflection, visual artifacts caused by the backscatter of light by unfocused particles

In microscopy

In microscopy, an artifact is an apparent structural detail that is caused by the processing of the specimen and is thus not a legitimate feature of the specimen. In light microscopy, artifacts may be produced by air bubbles trapped under the slide's cover slip.

In electron microscopy, distortions may be produced in the drying out of the specimen. Staining can cause the appearance of solid chemical deposits that may be seen as structures inside the cell. Different techniques including freeze-fracturing and cell fractionation may be used to overcome the problems of artifacts.

A crush artifact is an artificial elongation and distortion seen in histopathology and cytopathology studies, presumably because of iatrogenic compression of tissues. Distortion can be caused by the slightest compression of tissue and can provide difficulties in diagnosis. It may cause chromatin to be squeezed out of nuclei. Inflammatory and tumor cells are most susceptible to crush artifacts.

In radiography
In projectional radiography, visual artifacts that can constitute disease mimics include jewelry, clothes and skin folds.

In magnetic resonance imaging

In Magnetic resonance imaging, artifacts can be classified as patient-related, signal processing-dependent or hardware (machine)-related.

References

Computer graphic artifacts
Visual artifacts